The 2011 Howard Bison football team represented Howard University in the 2011 NCAA Division I FCS football season. The Bison were led by first year head coach Gary Harrell and played their home games at William H. Greene Stadium. They are a member of the Mid-Eastern Athletic Conference. They finished the season 5–6, 4–4 in MEAC play to finish in a tie for sixth place.

Schedule

References

Howard
Howard Bison football seasons
Howard Bison football